The 1968 Amstel Gold Race was the third edition of the annual road bicycle race "Amstel Gold Race", held on Sunday September 21, 1968, in the Dutch provinces of North Brabant and Limburg. The race stretched 245 kilometres, with the start in Helmond and the finish in Elsloo. There were a total of 152 competitors, and 34 cyclists finished the race.

Result

External links
Results

Amstel Gold Race
1968 in road cycling
1968 in Dutch sport